Suprabhatam is a Sanskrit prayer of the Suprabhātakāvya genre. It is a collection of hymns or verses recited early morning to awaken the deity in Hinduism. The metre chosen for a Suprabhātam poem is usually Vasantatilaka.

The most well-known Suprabhātam work is the Veṅkaṭeśasuprabhātam recited to awaken the deity Venkateswara. A rendition of the poem by renowned Carnatic vocalist M. S. Subbulakshmi is extremely popular which is played daily in many homes and temples (especially Tirumala Tirupati) in the wee hours of morning.

History
The genre of Suprabhātakāvya traces its origin to a single verse (1.23.2) in the Bālakāṇḍa of Vālmīki's Rāmāyaṇa, where Viśvāmitra calls out to Rāma to wake up.

Devanagari
कौसल्यासुप्रजा राम पूर्वा संध्या प्रवर्तते ।
उत्तिष्ठ नरशार्दूल कर्त्तव्यं दैवमाह्निकम् ॥

IAST
kausalyāsuprajā rāma pūrvā sandhyā pravartate ।
uttiṣṭha naraśārdūla karttavyaṃ daivamāhnikam  ॥

Translation, 1.23.2
O Rāma, the noble son of Kausalyā! The Sandhyā of the East commences. O! best of men (Purushottama)! Wake up, the daily duties have to be performed.

The Veṅkaṭeśasuprabhātam begins with this very verse.

Venkatesha Suprabhatam

The Veṅkaṭeśasuprabhātam was composed sometime between 1420 and 1432 C.E. by Prativādibhayaṅkara Śrī Anantācārya (also known as Annangaracharyar, and P B Annan). The poet was a disciple of Swami Manavala Mamuni, who was himself a disciple of Ramanuja. 

The Venkatesha Suprabhatam consists of four sections: Suprabhatam, Sri Venkatesa Stothram, Prapatti, and Mangalasasanam.

Text and meaning

Other Suprabhatam Works

There are many other lesser-known Suprabhātam works apart from the Veṅkaṭeśasuprabhātam. Some of these are -

 Śrīvighneśvarasuprabhātam. A Suprabhāta poem eulogizing Gaṇeśa.
 Śrīsiddhivināyakasuprabhātam. A Suprabhāta poem eulogizing Siddhivināyaka. Composed by M. Ramakrishna Bhat, retired professor of Benares Hindu University.
 Śrīkāśīviśvanāthasuprabhātam. A Suprabhāta poem eulogizing Kashi Vishwanath.
 Śrīsītārāmasuprabhātam. A Suprabhāta poem eulogizing Sītā and Rāma. Composed by Jagadguru Rambhadracharya.

Notes

References

External links

Telugu Rendering in WikiSource
Devanagari Rendering

Hindu music
Hindu prayer and meditation